Jorma Aksel Kortelainen (17 December 1932 – 27 December 2012) was a Finnish cross-country skier and rower who competed in the 1950s.

Kortelainen was born in Pyhäselkä.  He won a silver medal at the 1956 Winter Olympics in Cortina d'Ampezzo in the 4 × 10 km relay. He was also a successful rower who took part at the 1960 Summer Olympics in Rome.

Kortelainen died in Jyväskylä, at the age of 80, as a result of sepsis while being treated at the local hospital.

Cross-country skiing results

Olympic Games
1 medal – (1 silver)

References

External links
 Olympic profile

1932 births
2012 deaths
People from Joensuu
Finnish male cross-country skiers
Olympic cross-country skiers of Finland
Cross-country skiers at the 1956 Winter Olympics
Olympic silver medalists for Finland
Olympic medalists in cross-country skiing
Finnish male rowers
Rowers at the 1960 Summer Olympics
Olympic rowers of Finland
Medalists at the 1956 Winter Olympics
Sportspeople from North Karelia
20th-century Finnish people